Sander Gillé and Joran Vliegen were the defending champions but chose not to defend their title.

Denys Molchanov and Andrei Vasilevski won the title after defeating Andrea Vavassori and David Vega Hernández 6–3, 6–1 in the final.

Seeds

Draw

References

External links
 Main draw

Brest Challenger - Doubles